Kulachandra Singh was a Meitei monarch and the Maharaja of Manipur kingdom. He was a son of Maharaja Chandrakriti.

Exile to the Cellular Jail 
At the end of the Anglo-Manipur War in the year 1891, which resulted in the British victory, Kulachandra Singh and other 22 Manipuri freedom fighters were exiled to the then British penal colony in the Andaman and Nicobar Islands. At the time of their exile, the Cellular Jail (Kalapani) was about to be built in the island. So, Kulachandra Singh and the other 22 men were imprisoned on the Mount Manipur (Mount Harriet), in the present day South Andaman district.

Commemoration

Re-christening of a mountain peak and a national park 
Paying tribute to Kulachandra Singh's sacrifice for his motherland Manipur and spending the rest of his life in the Andaman islands, the Union Government of India officially renamed the Mount Harriet into Mount Manipur and the Mount Harriet National Park into Mount Manipur National Park. During October 2021, Amit Shah, a Union Home Minister of the Republic of India, initially announced the re-christening of the mountain and the national park.

Mount Manipur Memorial 
Mount Manipur Memorial is a memorial site, that commemorates and pays tributes to Meitei King Kulachandra Singh and the other exiled freedom fighters. The site is being built in the Mount Manipur (Mount Harriet) by the Government of Manipur, through an agreement with the authorities of the Andaman and Nicobar Islands, assisted by the Union Government of India.

See also 
List of Manipuri kings
Manipur (princely state)

References 

 Bir Tikendrajit – The Hero of Manipur in Press Information Bureau, Government of India website.

External links 
 Manipur State Archives – Tikendrajit

Meitei royalty
Hindu monarchs